Goggia braacki, also known commonly as  Braack's dwarf leaf-toed gecko, Braack's pygmy gecko, and the Karoo leaf-toed gecko, is a species of lizard in the family Gekkonidae. The species is endemic to South Africa.

Etymology
The specific name, braacki, is in honor of South African herpetologist Harold H. Braack.

Habitat
The preferred natural habitat of G. braacki is rocky areas of montane grassland.

Description

Reproduction
G. braacki is oviparous.

References

Further reading
Bauer AM, Good DA, Branch WR (1997). "The taxonomy of the southern African leaf-toed geckos (Squamata: Gekkonidae), with a review of Old World "Phyllodactylus " and the description of five new genera". Proceedings of the California Academy of Sciences 49: 447–497. (Goggia braacki, new combination).
Branch, Bill (2004). Field Guide to Snakes and other Reptiles of Southern Africa. Third Revised edition, Second impression. Sanibel Island, Florida: Ralph Curtis Books. 399 pp. . (Goggia braacki, p. 240 + Plate 87).
Good DA, Bauer AM, Branch WR (1996). "A new species of Phyllodactylus (Squamata: Gekkonidae) from the Karoo National Park, South Africa". African Journal of Herpetology 45 (2): 49–58. (Phyllodactylus braacki, new species).
Rösler H (2000). "Kommentierte Liste der rezent, subrezent und fossil bekannten Geckotaxa (Reptilia: Gekkonomorpha)". Gekkota 2: 28–153. (Goggia braacki, p. 83). (in German).

Goggia
Reptiles described in 1996
Endemic reptiles of South Africa
Taxa named by William Roy Branch